Enyalioides laticeps, the Amazon broad-headed wood lizard, is a dwarf iguanian lizard abundantly found in Amazonian rainforests. They are semi-arboreal and mostly live in forests. Other names for it include broad-headed wood lizards, Big-headed stick lizards (lagartijas de palo de cabezonas), Guichenot's Dwarf Iguana, Amazon Forest Dragon, or Amazon Dwarf-Iguana (Iguana enana amazónica). It is a small, ornamented lizard that grows up to 157 mm (0.5 ft) long and have very high vertebral crests along their backs. They change colors based on environmental factors. Amazon broad-headed wood lizards rely on rapid running to move around; however, they spend the vast majority of their time motionless, blending into the rainforest background (branches, palm fronds), and ambushing prey. When attacked by predators, E. laticeps may stay motionless like a wood stick to avoid predation. When found by predators, it may suddenly spring into motion, quickly reatreting to burrows in the ground.

Taxonomy 
The Amazon broad-headed wood lizard has at least sixteen close relatives, most of them found in Amazonian rainforests, such as Red-eyed Dwarf-Iguana (Enyalioides oshaughnessyi), Blue-spotted Dwarf-Iguana (Enyalioides praestabilis), Red-throated Dwarf-Iguana (Enyalioides rubrigularis), Blue-throated Dwarf-Iguana (Enyalioides microlepis), and Spiny Dwarf-Iguana (Enyalioides heterolepis).  Most of these lizards are also inhabitants of rainforest, small-sized, and closely resemble each other, with minor physical appearance distinctions. E. laticeps is distinct from these other species of Enyalioides in that it has homogenous sized caudal scales for each caudal section.

The Enyalioides wood lizard also closely resembles a variety of Asian dragons, such as the Chinese water dragon, and the Tuatara of New Zealand.  All have a laterally compressed body and crest running from the head down the back.  Although Asian dragons can reach lengths of 3 feet, and the Tuatara measures up to more than 1 foot, the Amazon wood lizards, which are dwarf lizards, have adults reaching only 0.5 ft.

Etymology 
The binomial name of Amazon broad-headed wood lizard, Enyalioides Laticeps, means “A broad-head lizard that is an Enyalius look-alike”. The genus Enyalius is a different Neotropical lizard of a different Family (Leiosauridae). The generic name Enyalioides is composed of the Latin words Enyalius, a Neotropical lizards of different Family and different genus, and the ancient Greek words -oides (εἶδος), meaning “look-alike”.  The specific epithet laticeps is derived from the Latin words latus, meaning “side or broad” and Latin suffix ceps, meaning “head”.

History 
The Amazon broad-headed wood lizard was reported by the French naturalist Alphonse Guichenot in literature in 1855 after his expedition in central parts of South American during the years 1843 to 1847.  This is why one of E. Laticeps’s common names is Guichenot's Dwarf Iguana.

Physical description 
The Amazon broad-headed wood lizard has a vertebral crest (spines) continuous throughout the body.  The crest is conspicuously high and well developed on the nape (the back of the neck) but low on the dorsal half of the body.

This species of Enyalioides is a dwarf Hoplocercid. For males, their maximum SVL (from snout to vent length) is 157 mm, and for females, 130 mm. Its head is relatively large, nearing ⅓ ~ ¼ of its SVL body length. It has a typical Enyalioides lizard four-sided pyramidal head shape, with two ridges formed by the projecting supraciliaris (area above the eye/eyebrows).  The width of the head is approximately 0.7-0.9 times the length, also being proportionally wide, which is where it gets the name “broad-headed wood lizard”. Its body is compressed laterally. E. laticeps has well developed forelimbs and long hind limbs. Its tail is long, at about 1.5-1.9 times its snout to vent length.  

Like other Enyalioid species, E. laticeps can change color when disturbed, replacing green with brown tones.  Therefore, dorsal scales of the Amazon broad-headed wood lizard varies from dull green to tan to brown, frequently with some blueish area; ventral scales varies from white to cream to tan; while gular region (the ventral throat region, which is relatively inconspicuous for Enyalioids) in males can be dark brown or black.

The general skin color can be predominantly spotless, but more commonly is superimposed with different lighter or darker patterns. The patterns can be a reticulate (net) pattern, dark brown or reddish-brown in color, distributed throughout the dorsolateral surfaces of body, limbs and tail. In some cases, the reticulate pattern is faint and inconspicuous.  The patterns could also be chevrons (V- or inverted V-shaped), with alternating lighter and darker color, superimposed on a dorsal longitudinal series of large, oval, and light areas.  Sometimes the pattern is simply scattered, irregular clear spots.  Juvenile males can have a pattern of convergent brown lines running towards, but not reaching, the mental (chin) of the lizard.  Ventral region of the animal is usually not or sparsely spotted. Males can be identified by a 2-3 scale wide strip of cream, white or orange color.

All wood iguanas (genus Enyalioides) are dwarf.  Therefore, several species of wood lizard exist with similar sizes, appearances, behavior and habitats in the Amazonian basin.    

Torres and Avila-Pires provided ways for diagnosing of the Amazon broad-headed wood lizard species: (1)  this particular species has dorsal and lateral scales that are homogenous (uniform in size), while other species have the dorsal and lateral scales increase in size posteriorly (in each caudal segment);  (2)  this species lacks mucrones (sharp tips) on its scales while the larger caudal scales of other species have mucrones or some type of projection; (3) it is the only species having smooth tail, almost circular in its cross-section; (4) most male E. laticeps have a longitudinal stripe of 2-3 scales wide of cream, white, or orange color that runs from the commissure of the mouth (junction of lips) to a point below the tympanum (eardrum); (5) Adults of this species also have a middorsal crest higher than that of other species; (6) The most similar species in coloration is E. praestabilis, a species that lacks the horizontal pale-colored lip stripe.

Ecology 
The Amazon broad-headed wood lizard is reported to be semi-arboreal (inhabiting trees and ground) and is found commonly in primary forest, but sometimes in secondary forest low on vegetation. During the day, this species has been observed mainly in small tree trunks with diameters less than 15 cm. They sleep on vegetation such as branches, palm fronds, or sapling trunks 30–240 cm above the ground, but sometimes inside burrows in the ground. The Amazon broad-headed wood lizard may also retreat into shallow forest floor holes at night. The lizard is found to adopt a horizontal position at night time and hug thin sticks during sleep. In a research study examining their sleeping patterns, flashlights or nearby humans did not bother them and the lizard switched between two sleeping sites within a small area over the seven nights that the observation spanned.

The Amazon broad-headed wood lizards are sunlight-loving, diurnal (active during the day) and omnivores (eat both plants and animals). They rely on running to move around.

When threatened, the lizard may stay motionless, flee or attempt a threat display, inflating its gular pouch (the ventral throat region), which would reveal its darker scales (red or black) patches, displaying its impressive jaws and teeth, although attempt was rarely made to bite.  

E. laticeps usually employs the crypsis mechanism to avoid predators. When E. laticeps is distressed, its green tones shift to brown tones, exhibiting metachromatism.

Distribution and habitat 
The Amazon broad-headed wood lizards are found in the Neotropics, distributed throughout the upper western Amazon basin, in Colombia, Ecuador, Peru and Brazil. This species is abundant in primary and sometimes secondary forests (regenerated after disturbance of the original forest vegetation by human or natural causes), at elevations between 80 and 1600 m.

The Amazon broad-headed wood lizard is reported to be sympatric (occupying the same geographical area without interbreeding) with various species.  In Ecuador it has been reported in sympathy with E. cofanorum, E. microlepis and E. praestabilis.  In southern Peru, it has been reported in sympathy with E. palpebralis, Morunasaurus annularis and M. peruvianus.  Therefore, the lizard is presumed to be sympatric with these species for most of its distribution range.

Behavior

Predators 
The Tropical Flat Snake Tripanurgos compressus or Siphlophis compressus is a known predator of E. laticeps, with juvenile E. laticeps being discovered in its stomach. E. laticeps utilizes its cryptic coloration as a mechanism to avoid predation. It may also flee and run suddenly in order to hide inside holes in the ground, or beneath logs. Other strategies employed by E. laticeps include staying still to blend into the vegetation, or running up and around trunks.

Diet 
70.4% of the Amazon broad-headed wood lizard diet consists of spiders, caterpillars and beetle larvae. E. laticeps also preys upon grasshoppers, crickets, and earthworms.

Lifecycle 
E. laticeps engage in sexual and dioecious reproduction. As with most lizards, they are oviparous (producing eggs).

Female E. laticeps exhibit breeding behavior that occurs throughout the year. Females are capable of laying 5 to 7 eggs. E. laticeps eggs are approximately 15-16.6 mm long. From April to August, female E. laticeps are observed to carry 10 or 11 oviductal eggs.

Conservation status 
Most wood lizard species, including Amazon broad-headed wood lizard (Enyalioides laticeps), are listed as “Least Concern”, following IUCN criteria. The Amazon broad-headed wood lizard is more adaptable, and not undergoing population declines nor facing major immediate threats of extinction, attributable to their dwarf size, quick running, broad range of inhabitants, and distribution in protected areas.

References

Enyalioides
Lizards of South America
Reptiles of Brazil
Reptiles of Colombia
Reptiles of Ecuador
Reptiles of Peru
Reptiles described in 1855
Taxa named by Alphonse Guichenot